Miguel Ángel Cárdenas Ferreira (born 8 September 1978) is a Paraguayan footballer who plays as a goalkeeper for Tiro Federal of the Torneo Argentino A in Argentina.

External links
 
 

1978 births
Living people
Paraguayan footballers
Association football goalkeepers
Club Nacional footballers
Club Sol de América footballers
Tiro Federal footballers
Paraguayan expatriate footballers
Paraguayan expatriate sportspeople in Argentina
Expatriate footballers in Argentina